Eileen Cecilia "Patricia" Collinge (September 20, 1892 – April 10, 1974) was an Irish-American actress and writer. She was best known for her stage appearances, as well as her roles in the films The Little Foxes (1941) and Shadow of a Doubt (1943). She was nominated for an Academy Award and won a NBR Award for The Little Foxes.

Early life

Collinge was born in Dublin to F. Channon Collinge and Emmie (née Russell) Collinge. She was educated there first by a governess and then at a girls' school. She took dance and piano lessons, which held no interest for her, and determined to be an actress.

Stage career

Collinge first appeared on the stage in 1904 in Little Black Sambo and Little White Barbara at the Garrick Theatre in London. She immigrated to the United States with her mother in 1907. Soon after, she appeared as a flower girl in The Queens of the Moulin Rouge (1908)  and as a supporting player in The Thunderbolt (1910) starring Louis Calvert, which was staged at the New Theatre (Century Theatre).

In 1911, Collinge played Youth in the Broadway production of Everywoman, with Laura Nelson Hall in the title role. She reprised the role in the 1912 London production starring Alexandra Carlisle. She appeared as Agnes with Douglas Fairbanks, Sr., Amelia Bingham, and William H. Crane in The New Henrietta, a play based on a comedy by Bronson Howard, produced at the Knickerbocker Theatre on Broadway in December 1913. In 1914, she again appeared with Fairbanks in He Comes Up Smiling.

Collinge toured in A Regular Businessman, was the original Pollyanna Whittier in Pollyanna, and toured with Tillie in 1919. In 1932, she appeared in Autumn Crocus. Her acting was acclaimed by a New York Times critic, who wrote, "Miss Collinge plays with the soft, pliant sincerity that makes her one of the most endearing actresses."

She was a member of the original Broadway cast of The Little Foxes with Tallulah Bankhead as the lead in 1939, playing the role of the tragic Birdie Hubbard. In 1941, she played the same part in the motion picture version, which starred Bette Davis. Other stage work included roles in productions of The Heiress, Just Suppose, The Dark Angel, The Importance of Being Earnest, To See Ourselves, and Lady with a Lamp. Her final stage appearance came in December 1952 in I've Got Sixpence at the Ethel Barrymore Theatre.

Film career
Collinge's film debut in 1941's The Little Foxes earned her an Academy Award for Best Supporting Actress nomination. Other films included Shadow of a Doubt (1943), Tender Comrade (1943), and The Nun's Story (1959).

According to the featurette included with the DVD of Shadow of a Doubt, Collinge rewrote the scene that takes place in the garage between Teresa Wright and Macdonald Carey, since Director Alfred Hitchcock and the actors were unhappy with the dialogue. Hitchcock was delighted with her work and used it in the film. She also worked with Alma Reville (Hitchcock's wife) and Ben Hecht on the screenplay for Hitchcock's Lifeboat (1944), which also starred Tallulah Bankhead.

Television
Collinge appeared in four episodes of the popular series Alfred Hitchcock Presents. In one episode, "The Cheney Vase", based on the play Kind Lady, she played a vulnerable, elderly, wealthy woman kept hostage in her own home by ruthless crooks (Darren McGavin and Ruta Lee) attempting to steal a valuable Primitive style vase. She also appeared in such television dramas as Laramie (1961), The United States Steel Hour (1962), East Side/West Side (1963), and N.Y.P.D. (1967).

Author
Collinge wrote the play Dame Nature (1938), an adaptation of a French drama by André Birabeau, in addition to some short stories for The New Yorker, and contributed to The New York Times Book Review. She also wrote The Small Mosaics of Mr. and Mrs. Engel, a travelogue that earned her a gold medal from the Italian government, and The B.O.W.S., which she co-authored with Margalo Gillmore.

Personal life and death
Collinge was married to James Nichols Smith (1891–1975) from June 10, 1921 until her death in 1974. They had no children.

Collinge died on April 10, 1974 in New York City, New York, at the age of 81 of a heart attack. She is buried with her husband at Saint Mary's Cemetery in Nantucket, Massachusetts.

Filmography

Awards and nominations

Bibliography

References

Sources

External links

 Patricia Collinge photo album NY Public Library, Billy Rose Collection
 
 
 

1892 births
1974 deaths
20th-century American actresses
20th-century Irish actresses
Actresses from Dublin (city)
American dramatists and playwrights
American film actresses
American stage actresses
American television actresses
Irish emigrants to the United States (before 1923)
Irish stage actresses
Irish television actresses
Irish women comedians
The New Yorker people
20th-century Irish comedians
20th-century American comedians